Sidney Clarke Adams (17 August 1904 – 24 March 1945) was an English first-class cricketer. He was a right-handed batsman and a leg-break bowler who played 11 matches of first-class cricket for Northamptonshire between 1926 and 1932.

Adams was born in Northampton. His only first-class fifty, a knock of 87, came against Dublin University in a match in which he recorded his best bowling figures of 6 for 32 and took wickets with the first two balls he bowled in first-class cricket. The victim of his first delivery was the playwright Samuel Beckett.

Gunner Adams died on 24 March 1945 near Hamminkeln, Germany, while serving with the 53rd (Worcestershire Yeomanry) Air Landing Light Regiment, Royal Artillery. He is buried at the Reichswald Forest War Cemetery.

References

External links
 

1904 births
1945 deaths
Military personnel from Northamptonshire
English cricketers
Cricketers from Northampton
London Counties cricketers
Burials in Germany
Northamptonshire cricketers
Royal Artillery soldiers
British Army personnel killed in World War II
Worcestershire Yeomanry soldiers